Lake Gradišče is a lake near Lukovica in Slovenia.

External links

Gradisce
Kamnik Bistrica basin